Fliura Khasanova (born December 31, 1964 in Chirchiq) is a Kazakhstani chess player, and a woman grandmaster.

She won the Girls' World Junior Chess Championship in 1983.

References

External links
Her games

World Junior Chess Champions
Chess woman grandmasters
Kazakhstani female chess players
1964 births
Living people
20th-century Kazakhstani women